Zond 3 was a 1965 space probe which performed a flyby of the Moon far side, taking a number of quality photographs for its time. It was a member of the Soviet Zond program while also being part of the Mars 3MV project. It was unrelated to Zond spacecraft designed for crewed circumlunar missions (Soyuz 7K-L1). It is believed that Zond 3 was initially designed as a companion spacecraft to Zond 2 to be launched to Mars during the 1964 launch window. The opportunity to launch was missed, and the spacecraft was launched on a Mars-crossing trajectory as a spacecraft test, even though Mars was no longer attainable.

Spacecraft design
The spacecraft was of the 3MV-4 type, similar to Zond 2. In addition to a 106.4 mm focal length  imaging system for visible light photography and ultraviolet spectrometry at 285-355 μm, it carried ultraviolet (190-275 μm) and infrared (3-4 μm) spectrophotometers, radiation sensors (gas-discharge and scintillation counters), charged particle detector, magnetometer, and micrometeoroid detector. It also had an experimental ion engine.

Operational history
Zond 3 was launched from Baikonur Cosmodrome on July 18, 1965, at 14:38 UTC, and was deployed from a Tyazhely Sputnik (65-056B) Earth-orbiting platform towards the Moon and interplanetary space. This was a repeat of a mission that failed in late 1963 intended to test communication at distances equivalent to the distances experienced by Mars and Earth.

The photos covered  of the lunar surface.

Zond 3 proceeded on a trajectory across Mars' orbit, but not at a time when planetary encounter would occur. The subsequent transmissions were also at progressively slower data rates but higher quality. It operated for 228 days, roughly equivalent to the time needed to survive a journey to Mars and exceeding that needed for Venus.

References
 This article was originally based on material from NASA (NSSDC) information on Zond 3

External links

 Zond 3 at Zarya.info
 Soviet Moon Images at Mentallandscape.com

Zond program
Derelict satellites in heliocentric orbit
Spacecraft launched in 1965
1965 in the Soviet Union
Lunar flybys